Pakistan Super League is a professional
Twenty20 cricket league, which is operated by the
Pakistan Cricket Board. It is contested between six franchises comprising cricketers from Pakistan and around the world (excluding India).
A player who leads the cricket team is known as its captain. Each team usually has one nominated captain, although if that player is not participating in a match another player will deputise for them. The captain of a cricket team typically shoulders more responsibility for results than team captains in other sports.

Key

List of PSL captains

This is a list of the players who have acted as captain in at least one match of PSL. Five teams competed in both; first and second seasons of the league. Sarfraz Ahmed, captain of the team Quetta Gladiators, is the most successful captain by winning most (29) matches. His team have been the runner up in 2016 and in 2017 and won the championship in 2019.

Source: ESPNcricinfo

See also 
 List of Pakistan Super League cricketers
 List of Pakistan Super League records and statistics

References

Cricket captains
Captains